Fancy was the name of two well known pirate ships:

 Fancy (ship), commanded by Henry Every
 Capture of the Fancy, commanded by Edward Low